FK Marcelová is a Slovak football team, based in the town of Marcelová.

Colours
Club colours are yellow and green.

External links
FK Marcelová official club website 
  
Club profile at Futbalnet.sk

References

Football clubs in Slovakia